Dennis Radtke (born 29 April 1979) is a German politician who has been serving as a Member of the European Parliament (MEP) since 24 July 2017, representing Germany. He is a member of the Christian Democratic Union, part of the European People's Party.

Early career
From 2008 until 2017, Radtke worked as trade union secretary with IG Bergbau, Chemie, Energie (IG BCE).

Political career
Until 2002, Radtke was a member of the Social Democratic Party (SPD).

Radtke has been a Member of the European Parliament since July 2017, when he succeeded Herbert Reul. In parliament, he has since been serving on the Committee on Employment and Social Affairs. In addition to his committee assignments, he is a member of the parliament’s delegation for relations with the Korean Peninsula and the European Parliament Intergroup on Trade Unions.

Since 2019, Radtke has been chairing the Christian Democratic Employees' Association (CDA) in North Rhine-Westphalia, succeeding Ralf Brauksiepe. That same year, he was elected to the national leadership of the CDA.

Radtke was nominated by his party as delegate to the Federal Convention for the purpose of electing the President of Germany in 2022.

Other activities
 IG Bergbau, Chemie, Energie (IG BCE), Member (since 1998)

Political positions
Ahead of the 2021 Christian Democratic Union of Germany leadership election, Radtke publicly endorsed Armin Laschet to succeed Annegret Kramp-Karrenbauer as the party’s chair.

References

Living people
1979 births
Christian Democratic Union of Germany MEPs
People from Bochum
MEPs for Germany 2019–2024
MEPs for Germany 2014–2019